Mappillai Sir is a 1988 Indian Tamil-language film written and directed by D. S. Balagan from a story by Balachandra Menon. The film stars Visu, Mohan and Rekha. It was released on 12 August 1988. The film was a remake of the Malayalam film Karyam Nissaram.

Plot 

Varadarajan is a trained attorney who does not practice due to having promised his father-in-law when he married his wife. They have two daughters. His neighbour is a retired Army Colonel who has health issues, is married to Sumithra. The daughters marry their lovers with their father's consent, despite their mother's disapproval. The story then focuses on their reconciliation.

Cast 
 Visu as Varadarajan
 Mohan as the driving master
 Rekha
 Jayanti as Meenakshi
 Kishmu as Colonel
 Dilip as Dilip
 Sethu Vinayagam
 Master Suresh as Viji
 Sumithra as Mary
 Manorama as social worker
 Pournami as Tara

Production 
Mappillai Sir was written and directed by D. S. Balagan from a story by Balachandra Menon. The film was produced by T. Subbulakshmi under Lakshmi Raja Films, photographed by V. Ramamurthy and edited by the duo Ganesh–Kumar.

Soundtrack 
The soundtrack was composed by the duo Shankar–Ganesh, with lyrics by Idya Chandran.

Release and reception 
Mappillai Sir was released on 12 August 1988. NKS of The Indian Express wrote, "The Maappillai Saar objective is the taming of the arrogant Jayanthi [...] The taming of the shrew line having exhausted itself midway, the film occupies itself with an assortment of cooked up conflicts". Jayamanmadhan of Kalki criticised the film for its writing, likening it to a car being driven without a brake.

References

External links 
 

1980s Tamil-language films
1988 comedy-drama films
Films scored by Shankar–Ganesh
Indian comedy-drama films
Tamil remakes of Malayalam films